Battle of Jackson may refer to:
 Battle of Jackson, Mississippi (May 14, 1863), part of the Vicksburg Campaign in the American Civil War
 Battle of Jackson, Tennessee (December 19, 1862), also during the American Civil War

Not to be confused with:
 Jackson Expedition (July 1863), confrontation in the aftermath of the surrender of Vicksburg (American Civil War)